The 1960 Chicago Cubs season was the 89th season of the franchise, the 85th season in the National League and the 45th season at Wrigley Field. The Cubs finished seventh in the eight-team National League with a record of 60–94, 35 games behind the NL and World Series champion Pittsburgh Pirates. The Cubs drew 809,770 fans to Wrigley Field, also seventh in the circuit.

The 1960 Cubs were managed by two men, Charlie Grimm and Lou Boudreau. Grimm, 61, began his third different tenure as the team's pilot at the outset of the season, but after only 17 games he swapped jobs on May 4 with Cubs' broadcaster Boudreau. On that day, the Cubs were 6–11 and in seventh place, six games behind Pittsburgh. Boudreau, 42, managed the Cubs for the season's final 137 contests, posting a 54–83 (.394) mark. The team avoided the cellar by only one game over the tailending Philadelphia Phillies.

Offseason 
 October 8, 1959: Randy Jackson was released by the Cubs.
 October 30, 1959: Del Rice was signed as a free agent by the Cubs.
 December 6, 1959: Lee Walls, Lou Jackson, and Bill Henry were traded by the Cubs to the Cincinnati Reds for Frank Thomas.

Regular season

Season standings

Record vs. opponents

Notable transactions 
 April 8, 1960: Ron Perranoski, Johnny Goryl, Lee Handley (minors), and $25,000 were traded by the Cubs to the Los Angeles Dodgers for Don Zimmer. 
 May 13, 1960: Tony Taylor and Cal Neeman were traded by the Cubs to the Philadelphia Phillies for Don Cardwell and Ed Bouchee.
 June 4, 1960: Del Rice was released by the Cubs.
 July 15, 1960: Earl Averill and $30,000 were traded by the Cubs to the Milwaukee Braves for Al Heist.

Roster

Player stats

Batting

Starters by position 
Note: Pos = Position; G = Games played; AB = At bats; H = Hits; Avg. = Batting average; HR = Home runs; RBI = Runs batted in

Other batters 
Note: G = Games played; AB = At bats; H = Hits; Avg. = Batting average; HR = Home runs; RBI = Runs batted in

Pitching

Starting pitchers 
Note: G = Games pitched; IP = Innings pitched; W = Wins; L = Losses; ERA = Earned run average; SO = Strikeouts

Other pitchers 
Note: G = Games pitched; IP = Innings pitched; W = Wins; L = Losses; ERA = Earned run average; SO = Strikeouts

Relief pitchers 
Note: G = Games pitched; W = Wins; L = Losses; SV = Saves; ERA = Earned run average; SO = Strikeouts

Awards and honors 
 Ernie Banks, National League Home Run Champion

Farm system

Notes

References 

1960 Chicago Cubs season at Baseball Reference

Chicago Cubs seasons
Chicago Cubs season
Chicago Cubs